Little Sun is a nonprofit organization founded in 2012 to deliver affordable clean energy in Africa and inspire people to take climate action globally. It was established by the engineer Frederik Ottesen and the artist Olafur Eliasson whose wide-ranging solo shows – featuring installations, paintings, sculptures, photography, and film – have appeared in major museums around the globe.

In 2014, Little Sun has been awarded a $5 million impact investment by Bloomberg Philanthropies.

Impact 
To date, Little Sun has provided clean power and light to over 3.2 million people in Sub-Saharan Africa, enabled 58 million additional study hours for children, saved households $150 million in expenses, and helped reduce CO₂ emissions by 800,000 metric tons. By working with local entrepreneurs, Little Sun has also helped create thousands of local jobs, and generated profits for rural communities in Sub-Saharan Africa, particularly for women.

Little Sun works primarily in Burkina Faso, Ethiopia, Senegal, Rwanda, and Zambia, drawing on the expertise of in-country staff. Through close partnerships with local organizations, Little Sun operates in Nigeria, Tanzania, Kenya, and South Africa. Little Sun has offices in New York, Berlin, Addis Ababa, and Lusaka.

Solar Products 
Through its social enterprise, Little Sun sells solar devices around the world to raise funds and make solar lights and chargers available to energy-impoverished rural communities in Africa. Their range of solar products includes the Little Sun Original lamp, Little Sun Charge phone charger, and the Little Sun Diamond lamp.

Culture Program 
In 2021, Little Sun launched a culture program to engage artists and other creative voices to craft new narratives around climate change. Its aim is to shift the often data-driven climate conversation into an intimate dialogue and turn fear into hope. Their first campaign, Reach for the Sun, comprised a 10 step digital guide to creating a solar powered world and was designed to inspire, inform, and activate those concerned by climate change.

Their second project, Fast Forward, was a series of short films exploring artists’ dreams for a regenerative world. Featuring over 300 global voices, the short films were made by artists from Ethiopia, Senegal, and the United States – some of the regions in which Little Sun operates. The Fast Forward film 'Possible World' was screened at Times Square.

References

External links
 Official web site

Social enterprises
Solar-powered devices
Economy of Berlin
Non-profit organisations based in Berlin
B Lab-certified corporations
Energy in Africa